The Bangladesh Inland Water Transport Authority also known as BIWTA is the authority who controls the inland water transport in Bangladesh. It's also responsible for managing development and maintenance of inland water transport system.

History

Formation 
The department was first established in 1958 by the former East Pakistan government as East Pakistan Inland Water Transport Authority (EPIWTA). It was established for overall control, management, and development of inland water transports in the entire region. This agency was introduced on October 31, 1958, with the ordinance called the East Pakistan Inland water Transport Authority Ordinance 1958 (E.P. Ordinance, NO LXXV of 1958). Later the government appointed three constituted authority of this institution on November 4, 1958. After independence of Bangladesh this department was named as Bangladesh Inland Water Transport Authority. Today, an appointed advisory committee advise in respect of all related development, maintenance, and operations of inland water transport and of inland waterways in Bangladesh.

References

External links 
 

1958 establishments in East Pakistan
Water transport in Bangladesh
Inland waterway authorities
Government agencies established in 1958